Surgical Spirit is a British television sitcom starring Nichola McAuliffe and Duncan Preston that aired from 14 April 1989 to 7 July 1995. It was written by Annie Bruce, Raymond Dixon, Graeme Garden, Peter Learmouth, Paul McKenzie and Annie Wood. It was made for the ITV network by Humphrey Barclay Productions for Granada Television. In January 2022, Forces TV started showing all 50 episodes of Surgical Spirit, while the first two series were made available on BritBox in April 2022.

Plot
The series was based around Sheila Sabatini, a senior surgeon at the Gillies Hospital, whose verbal skills have most people running for cover as her tongue is as sharp as her scalpel. She dominated the operating theatre, while at home she was divorcing her Italian husband, Remo, with whom she had a son, Daniel. Sheila was also a gossip, often gossiping with her best friend, theatre administrator Joyce Watson.

One of the major themes in the programme was her developing relationship with Jonathan Haslam, the anaesthetist. At the end of the sixth series, they married and she had become director of surgery, while her son had become a medical student at the hospital, much to her annoyance.

Cast
Nichola McAuliffe as Mrs. Sheila Sabatini
Duncan Preston as Dr. Jonathan Haslam
Marji Campi as Joyce Watson
David Conville as Mr. George Hope-Wynne
Emlyn Price as Mr. Neil Copeland
Suzette Llewellyn as Sister Cheryl Patching
Beresford le Roy as Michael Sampson
Lyndam Gregory as Dr. Simon Field (series 1–4)
Simon Harrison as Mr. Giles Peake
Andrew Groves as Daniel Sabatini

Production

The outside shots were of Lister Hospital in Stevenage, Hertfordshire.

Cancellation

Granada Television decided to decommission the programme after the conclusion of the seventh series.

Episodes

Series overview

Series 1 (1989)

Series 2 (1990)

Series 3 (1991)

Series 4 (1992)

Series 5 (1993)

Series 6 (1994)

Series 7 (1995)

Home releases
All seven series of Surgical Spirit have now been released on DVD. An 8-disc set of the complete series has also been released.

References

External links
.
Surgical Spirit at British TV Comedy.
.

1989 British television series debuts
1995 British television series endings
1980s British sitcoms
1990s British sitcoms
English-language television shows
ITV sitcoms
Television series by ITV Studios
Television shows produced by Granada Television